Jill Allgood (15 November 1910 – 1995) was a British producer, director, script writer, author and broadcaster who worked for the BBC.

Allgood was a personal friend of Bebe Daniels and Ben Lyon, and worked with them professionally. In 1944 she was working for Cecil Madden, Head of BBC Overseas Entertainment, and from 1944 to 1946, with Howard Agg (and later with C. F. Meehan), she devised and produced a weekly/fortnightly programme for forces in hospitals called Here's Wishing You Well Again. There she got to know Bebe and Ben, who were often requested guests on that programme. She collaborated with Bebe on episodes of Life with the Lyons, and wrote their biography Bebe and Ben.

Between 1947 and 1949 Jill Allgood wrote documentary scripts for the BBC's Woman's Hour, followed by work as editor, presenter and producer of children's radio programmes. In 1960 she created nine episodes of Four Feather Falls, a TV show produced by Gerry Anderson for Granada Television.

Radio

Television

Filmography

Bibliography

References 

BBC radio presenters
BBC radio producers
1910 births
1995 deaths
Women radio producers